Corn poppy with lamb is a dish commonly used by Aegean coast and Aegean Sea islands Turkish and Greek people.

Ingredients typically include corn poppy, lamb chunks, onion, juice of half a lemon, flour, butter and salt.

See also

 List of lamb dishes

References

External links
https://archive.today/20140126120707/http://www.sihirliyemek.com/kuzu-etli-gelincik-tarifi/

Greek cuisine
Turkish cuisine
Lamb dishes
Cretan cuisine